Romed Baumann (born 14 January 1986) is a German and former Austrian World Cup alpine ski racer. Born in St. Johann in Tyrol, Baumann has two World Cup victories, both in Super combined.  He skied for Austria for many years, but he chose to compete under the German flag prior to the 2019/20 season due to not being included in the Austrian A-team.

World Cup results

Season standings

Race podiums
 2 wins – (2 SC) 
 10 podiums – (4 DH, 1 SG, 4 SC, 1 K) 
{|class="wikitable"
|-
! Season
! Date
! Location
! Discipline
! Place
|-
|style="text-align:center;"| 2007|| align=right|10 Dec 2006|| Reiteralm, Austria || align=center|Super Combined ||align=center|2nd
|-
|style="text-align:center;"| 2009|| align=right bgcolor="#BOEOE6" |22 Feb 2009|| Sestriere, Italy ||bgcolor="#BOEOE6" align=center|Super Combined || bgcolor="#BOEOE6" align=center|1st
|-
|style="text-align:center;"| 2010|| align=right|11 Dec 2009|| Val d'Isère, France || align=center|Super Combined || align=center|3rd
|-
|rowspan=3 style="text-align:center;"| 2011 || align=right|28 Nov 2010 || Lake Louise, Canada || align=center| Super G || align=center|3rd
|-
| align=right|18 Dec 2010|| Val Gardena, Italy || align=center| Downhill || align=center|2nd
|-
| align=right|23 Jan 2011||rowspan=2| Kitzbühel, Austria || align=center| Combined || align=center|3rd
|-
|align=center rowspan=3| 2012 || align=right|21 Jan 2012|| align=center| Downhill || align=center|2nd
|-
| align=right|4 Feb 2012|| rowspan=2| Chamonix, France || align=center| Downhill || align=center|2nd
|-
| bgcolor="#BOEOE6" align=right|5 Feb 2012|| bgcolor="#BOEOE6" align=center|Super Combined || bgcolor="#BOEOE6" align=center|1st
|-
|style="text-align:center;"| 2015|| align=right|28 Feb 2015|| Garmisch-Partenkirchen, Germany || align=center|Downhill ||align=center|2nd
|-
|15 March  Soldeu|2nd

World Championship results

Olympic results

References

External links

Austrian male alpine skiers
German male alpine skiers
1986 births
Living people
Alpine skiers at the 2010 Winter Olympics
Alpine skiers at the 2014 Winter Olympics
Alpine skiers at the 2022 Winter Olympics
Olympic alpine skiers of Austria
Olympic alpine skiers of Germany
People from Kitzbühel District
Sportspeople from Tyrol (state)
Austrian emigrants to Germany